Hunter Valley, or Hunter Region, is the valley of the Hunter River in New South Wales, Australia.

Hunter Valley may also refer to:

 Hunter Valley Coal Chain, a chain of coal delivery
 Hunter Valley Grammar School
 Hunter Valley Important Bird Area
 Hunter Valley Railway Trust, a railway museum
 Hunter Valley Steamfest, a locomotive event
 Hunter Valley wine, a wine region

See also